The 1987–88 Sussex County Football League season was the 63rd in the history of Sussex County Football League a football competition in England.

Division One

Division One featured 14 clubs which competed in the division last season, along with two new clubs, promoted from Division Two:
Pagham
Selsey

League table

Division Two

Division Two featured eleven clubs which competed in the division last season, along with four new clubs.
Clubs relegated from Division One:
Chichester City
Midhurst & Easebourne
Clubs promoted from Division Three:
Crowborough Athletic
Langney Sports

League table

Division Three

Division Three featured ten clubs which competed in the division last season, along with four new clubs:
Franklands Village, relegated from Division Two
Hassocks, demoted from Division Two
Mile Oak, joined from the Southern Counties Combination League
Sidley United, relegated from Division Two

League table

References

1987-88
1987–88 in English football leagues